Tesco Donabate Distribution Centre is a national retail distribution centre located in Donabate, Fingal, Ireland.

History
The distribution centre was developed by Tesco in 2007 at a cost of €60 million and immediately sold for €120 million in a sale and leaseback deal to a consortium assembled by KPMG. It is located in the jurisdiction of Fingal, in the historic County Dublin, near to the M1 motorway. In 2014 it was sold to a South African property fund for €129 million. In 2019 it was sold to South Korean firm KTB Investments & Securities and KTB Asset Management for €160m.

Use

The facility employs over 600 people, and handles up to 1.5 million cases per week. It manages and distributes all ambient grocery (packaged and processed) and some non-food products for Tesco Ireland's network of 149 stores.

Staff wear arm-mounted terminals (AMTs) to monitor productivity, which attracted media criticism in 2013.

See also
List of largest buildings by usable volume

References

Warehouses in the Republic of Ireland
Tesco
Buildings and structures in Fingal